Vicky Daada is a 1989 Telugu-language crime film produced by D. Sivaprasad Reddy under the Kamakshi Art Movies banner, directed by A. Kodandarami Reddy. It stars Nagarjuna, Radha,  Juhi Chawla  and music composed by Raj–Koti. The film was dubbed into Hindi with the same title.

Plot
Vikram is a graduate in law. He and Sravani are both in love with each other. She, one day, leaves town for a while and comes back to see Nagarjuna as a thug named Vicky Dada (his titular role). Nagarjuna turned into a criminal because of the corruption in court. He is after the villains (led by Kannada Prabhakar). How he stops them and helps the poor forms the rest of the story.

Cast

Nagarjuna as Vikram 
Radha as Revathi
Juhi Chawla as Sravani
Kannada Prabhakar as Prabhakar 
Gollapudi Maruthi Rao as Amurtha Rao
Giri Babu as Lawyer Giridhar Rao
Ranganath as D.I.G. Ranganatha Rao 
Kota Srinivasa Rao as Inspector Kota
Sudhakar as Amurtha Rao's son
Prasad Babu as Amurtha Rao's son
Vinod as Jaggu
Vankayala as Vankayala Master
Bhimeswara Rao as Principal 
Srividya as Justice Srividya
Vara Lakshmi as Rekha 
Kalpana Rai

Soundtrack
Music composed by Raj–Koti. Lyrics were written by Veturi. Music released on AMC Audio Company.

References

External links
 

1989 films
Films directed by A. Kodandarami Reddy
Indian courtroom films
Films about corruption in India
1980s Telugu-language films
Films scored by Raj–Koti
Indian crime films
1980s crime films